The Signal Corps (Corps de Transmissions) of the French Army, is the military administrative corps which specialises in military communications and communications and information systems (CIS).

History 
After early developments 1793–1899, first specifically signals units were formed circa 1900 as part of the Engineers.  The experience of the Battle of France showed that signals units being under the aegis of the Engineers did no longer allow for fully effective communications. As a result, on 1 June 1942, by Ministerial Decree no 3600/EMA/1 of 4 May 1942, Transmissions became a distinct arm, as part of the Armistice Army (of Vichy France).

Current Formations and Units 

 Information and Communication Systems Command (Commandement des Systèmes d’Information et de Communication), in Cesson-Sévigné
 School of Signals (École de Transmissions), in Cesson-Sévigné
 Centre of Initial Training for Non-Commissioned Members for CSIC Command (Centre de Formation Initiale des Militaires)/18éme Régiment de Transmissions, in Dieuze
 Centre/Regimental Staff
 Instruction Office
 x2 Instruction Companies
 Logistics Office
 28th Signal Regiment (28éme Régiment de Transmissions), in Issoire — Providing telecommunications and military information systems
 Command and Logistics Company
 x7 Communications Company
 x1 Reserve Company
 40th Signal Regiment (40éme Régiment de Transmissions), in Thionville — Providing Information and Communication systems
 Command and Logistics Company
 x6 Communications Company
 x1 Reserve Intervention Company
 41st Signal Regiment (41éme Régiment de Transmissions), in Douai — Providing support with divisional command posts
 Command and Logistics Company
 x6 Communications Company
 x1 Reserve Intervention Company
 48th Signal Regiment (48éme Régiment de Transmissions), in Agen — Providing training and operations support command, command posts
 Command and Logistics Company
 x6 Communications Company
 x1 Reserve Intervention Company
 53rd Signal Regiment (53éme Régiment de Transmissions), in Lunéville — Providing SIC and HQ main command posts
 Command and Logistics company
 2nd–6th Companies, one for long distance communications, one for command and support to the divisions, and one ready for air-mobile deployments (4th)
 7th Company supporting equipment and supply deployed units
 8th Reserve Security and Defence Company
 Intelligence Command (Commandement du Renseignement) — Command isn't a transmissions affiliated command
 785th Electronic Warfare Company (785éme Compagnie de Guerre Electronique), in Saint-Jacques-de-la-Lande
 44th Signal Regiment (44éme Régiment de Transmissions), in Mutzig — Electromagnetic and Acquisition Intelligence
 Command and Logistics Company
 x6 Electronic Warfare Companies
 54th Signal Regiment (54éme Régiment de Transmissions), in Haguenau — Tactical electronic warfare regiment
 Command and Logistics Company
 Administration and Support Company
 Operational Centre for Electronic Warfare Preparation
 x4 Electronic Warfare Companies
 x1 Reserve Intervention Company
 Regiments not under a specific command
 Aeuronautical Information and Communication Systems Tactical Group (Groupe Tactique des Systemes d'Information et de Communications Aéronautiques), in Évreux — Air Force communications unit
 Joint Directorate of Infrastructure Networks and Information Systems (Direction Interarmées des Résaux d'Infrastructure et des Systémes d'Information), at Fort de Bicêtre — Provides Joint communications for troops in the country and on deployments, along with secure government communications
 Joint Directorate of Infrastructure Networks of Information Systems of the Île-de-France/8th Signal Regiment (Direction Interarmées des Réseaux d'Infrastructures des Systèmes d'Information d'Île de France / 8éme Régiment de Transmissions), at Fort Mont-Valérien, Suresnes — Joint regiment providing telecommunications and information systems for the Ministry of Defence
 National Operational Support Centre/43rd Signal Battalion (Centre National de Soutien Opérational/43éme Bataillon de Transmissions), in Orléans — Logistical support body for the DIRISI

See also 
 Military history of France during World War II#French State Army (1940–44)
 History of the French Army

Footnotes

References 
 (Part of the APPAT collection)

Arms of the French Army
Military communications corps